Krešimir Makarin (born 7 January 1987) is a Croatian retired footballer who plays as a forward or a winger.

Club career
Makarin has played for Hajduk Split, Kamen Ingrad, Šibenik and HNK Cibalia in the Croatian Prva HNL.

References

External links
 

1987 births
Living people
Footballers from Rijeka
Association football forwards
Croatian footballers
Croatia youth international footballers
HNK Hajduk Split players
HNK Šibenik players
NK Kamen Ingrad players
NK Istra 1961 players
HNK Cibalia players
NK Solin players
NK Zagora Unešić players
Croatian Football League players
First Football League (Croatia) players